The Maine Black Bears represent the University of Maine in Women's Hockey East Association during the 2017–18 NCAA Division I women's ice hockey season.

Offseason
June 22: Tereza Vanišová was named the Czech Republic's women's player of the year. She scored 5 goals in the 2017 IIHF World Championships in Plymouth, Michigan

Recruiting

Standings

Roster

2017-18 Black Bears

se

2017-18 Schedule

|-
!colspan=12 style=" "| Regular Season

|-
!colspan=12 style=""| WHEA Tournament

Awards and honors

References

Maine
Maine Black Bears women's ice hockey seasons